Lonely One Nunatak is an eroded rock outcrop  northwest of the Morozumi Range, Antarctica. The low outcrop rises above the relatively featureless ice at the west side of the confluence of Gressitt Glacier and Rennick Glacier. The name, applied by the northern party of the New Zealand Geological Survey Antarctic Expedition, 1963–64, alludes to the relative isolation of the feature.

References

Nunataks of Victoria Land
Pennell Coast